Hay amores que matan is a Venezuelan telenovela written by Carlos Pérez and produced by Radio Caracas Televisión in 2000. This telenovela lasted 120 episodes and was distributed internationally by RCTV International. In international broadcasts it was also known as Amanda, hay amores que matan.

Carolina Tejera and Luis Fernandez starred as the main protagonists.

Synopsis 
In 1975, three young reporters and a priest are investigating criminal acts tied to Gumersindo Montenegro – a rising politician with a bright future. His acts of revenge will forever change their lives – and his. Twenty-five years later, two children born from this tragedy – Gumersindo’s son Cesár Augusto, and Amanda, raised by Father Tejedor – are shocked by a second murder of vengeance. Haunted by a past that ties them together and yet also tears them apart, their story touches many others, linked by passion, revenge, intrigue, and fate. There is Mónica Montenegro, whose loveless marriage leads to a dangerous search for the truth. Aleluya Sotomayor, a former prostitute who escapes her past only to confront the painful destiny of her daughter. María Solita, a naive but talented youth cruelly torn from her one true love. And Emma de Castro León, the glamorous wealthy widow whose nightmares of sexual slavery somehow envelop her. Amanda is the story of five women and how the power of love – the one constant in all their lives – changes everything they think they know, challenges everything they believe to be right. It is the story of how love, in the end, truly conquers all.

Cast
Carolina Tejera as Amanda Santacruz
Luis Fernandez as Cesar Augusto Montenegro
Carlos Camara as Saturno Guzman
Gledys Ibarra as Aleluya Sotomayor
Franklin Virguez as Fredimatico Gonzalez
Julie Restifo as Emma de Castro Leon
Carlos Olivier as Gumersindo Montenegro
Jennifer Rodriguez as Lucia Castro Leon
Alba Roversi as Ifigenia Barreto
Roberto Moll as Pancho Tejedor
Alicia Plaza as Monica de Montenegro
Juan Carlos Alarcon as Machoflaco
Ambar Diaz as Maria Solita
Alfonso Medina as José Humbertico Alcántara
Flor Elena González as Elpidia
Marcos Moreno as El Indio
Juan Carlos Gardie as Charles Luis Viscaya Segundo
Reina Hinojosa as Carmen Felicia Lozado
Hans Cristopher as Alfredo Azcarate
Leonardo Marrero as Argimiro
Margarita Hernandez as Eva Santacruz
Mirela Mendoza as Daniela
Rebeca Aleman as Blanquita
Martin Brassesco as Jean Franco

References

External links
Hay Amores Que Matan at the Internet Movie Database
Opening credits

2000 telenovelas
RCTV telenovelas
Venezuelan telenovelas
2000 Venezuelan television series debuts
2000 Venezuelan television series endings
Spanish-language telenovelas
Television shows set in Caracas